The 1992 Notre Dame Fighting Irish football team represented the University of Notre Dame in the 1992 NCAA Division I-A football season. The team was coached by Lou Holtz and played its home games at Notre Dame Stadium in South Bend, Indiana.

Rivalries
 In the Holy War match against Boston College, Notre Dame beat BC to claim the Frank Leahy Memorial Bowl.
 Notre Dame beat Michigan State to claim the Megaphone Trophy.
 Notre Dame beat Purdue to claim the Shillelagh Trophy.
 Notre Dame beat USC to claim the Jeweled Shillelagh.
Notre Dame lost the Legends Trophy to Stanford.

Schedule

Roster

Game summaries

at Northwestern

Michigan

at Michigan State

Purdue

Stanford

at Pittsburgh

BYU

Navy

Boston College

Penn State

 Source: 

With snowfall starting early in the game, heavy during the first half, this game has been nicknamed the "Snow Bowl".

at USC

Cotton Bowl

Team players drafted into the NFL

Awards and honors
 Reggie Brooks finished fifth in voting for the Heisman Trophy.
 Former Fighting Irish player Jim Lynch was inducted into the College Football Hall of Fame

References

Notre Dame
Notre Dame Fighting Irish football seasons
Cotton Bowl Classic champion seasons
Notre Dame Fighting Irish football